Gadiseer is a village in the Anantnag district in the Indian administered union territory of Jammu and Kashmir. It is located on the bank of Jhelum River (Veith- Vatasta). PIN code of Gadiseer is 192124 and its postal head office is Bijbehara. The village falls in the vicinity (jurisdiction) of tehsil Bijbehara in Dachnipora Block.

Geography
It is  away from the national capital New Delhi and about  from Jammu. It is approximately 5,000 meters above sea level. It shares its boundaries in the west with River Jehlum and on the other sides with the villages like Zirpara, Arm Gund, Duptyar, Batagund, Veeri and Guree.

History 
It is generally believed that the history of Gadiseer started with the advent of Migrant Muslims in Gadiseer near about in the last decade of 14th century.

Gadiseer was Port of South Kashmir till 1990's, Gadiseer was called Hub of all Markets in South Kashmir, but unfortunately, we are handicapped to have an abundant material about Gadiseer at our disposal. It is because that the early history of Gadiseer is obscure.

Demographics 
Gadiseer is a village situated in Bijbehara tehsil of Anantnag district in Jammu and Kashmir. As per the Population Census 2011, there are total 210 families residing in the village Gadiseer. The total population of Gadiseer is 1,700 out of which 884 are males and 816 are females thus the Average Sex Ratio of Gadiseer is 923.

The population of Children of age 0–6 years in Gadiseer village is 206 which is 12% of the total population. There are 112 male children and 94 female children between the age 0–6 years. Thus as per the Census 2011 the Child Sex Ratio of Gadiseer is 839 which is less than Average Sex Ratio (923) of Gadiseer village.

As per the Census 2011, the literacy rate of Gadiseer is 68.2%. Thus Gadiseer village has higher literacy rate compared to 50.6% of Anantnag district. The male literacy rate is 78.11% and the female literacy rate is 57.62% in Gadiseer village.

Population = 1,700, Families = 21, Literacy = 68.21% Sex Ratio = 923.

Gadiseer Data as per Census 2011 As per the Population Census 2011 data, following are some quick facts about Gadiseer village .

Other information 
Areas / Communities / Mohallas in Gadiseer Bijbehara;

From North To South;

 Usman Colony.
 Bonmarg.
 Astaan Mohalla.
 Wani Mohalla.
 Rather Pora.
 Thoker Pora.

Mosques in Gadiseer Bijbehara;

 Jamia Masjid Gadiseer.
 Astaan Masjid (Astan Mohalla).
 Masjid-E-Usman (Usman Colony).
Masjid-E-Umar (Usman Colony).

Schools / Institutes in Gadiseer Bijbehara;

 Mushtaq Memorial Daresgah Gadiseer Bijbehara.
 Islamia Daresgah Gadiseer Bijbehara.
 Scholar's Institute of Education {Closed} ( Now Radiant Public School Anantnag ).
 Govt. Middle School Gadiseer Bijbehara .
 414 Foundation.
 414 Academy.

Rivers / Canals flowing through Gadiseer Bijbehara;

 River Jehlum.
Zain-ul-Abidin Canal.
 Kier Spring.
Veeri Canal.

Places / Sites / Spots /  in Gadiseer Bijbehara;

 Chinar Park Gadiseer Bijbehara.
 Daaf Kadel.
 Sunderban II.
Technology Parks in Gadiseer Bijbehara;

 414 Technologies (Headquarter At 414 HackerWay, Gadiseer Bijbehara).
 Common Service Center Gadiseer (Ward Number 45, Gadiseer Bijbehara).

Sport in Gadiseer Bijbehara;

 414 Storm Riders (Team 414) (Sports Teams Sponsored By 414 Technologies)
 Gadiseer Cricket Academy Gadiseer Cricket Squad of 30 Cricket Players from where " Gadiseer Cricket Club & Gadiseer Bijbehara Cricket Team " choose its Playing XI.
 Gadiseer Cricket Club (Team 'B' Cricket Team of Gadiseer Bijbehara)
 Gadiseer Bijbehara Cricket Team (Old Cricket Team of Gadiseer Bijbehara)
 Gadiseer United (United Cricket Team of Gadiseer Bijbehara is a Cricket Team of Top 11 Players chosen from "Gadiseer Bijbehara") Gadiseer United Was Founded in 2021 By Er Davood Raja.
Awards in Gadiseer Bijbehara;

 Student of The Year Gadiseer ( The Particular Award Was First Organized By The Founder / CEO of 414 Technologies, Er Davood Raja In 2020.
 First Student of The Year Gadiseer Bijbehara (2020) " Irfan Rashid " Was Declared By 414 Technologies Officials.
 As per new updates 2nd one of 2021 will be declared soon and same will be updated here.

See also
Bijbehara

References

External links 
 Facebook
 Wiki Pin Code 192124
 Maps of India
 Vlist
 Census 2011
 Census India

Anantnag district